Seria Library is a public library located in Seria, a town in Belait, Brunei.

History 
Seria Library was established on 12 February 1977, initially at Jalan Bunga Melur. The library was then moved to the present building at Lorong Bolkiah, in which it was inaugurated on 28 February 1990 by the then Deputy Minister of Culture, Youth and Sports, Selamat bin Munap.

References 

Dewan Bahasa dan Pustaka Library
Libraries in Brunei
Belait District
Libraries established in 1977
1977 establishments in Brunei